Gustavia verticillata is a species of woody plant in the family Lecythidaceae. It is found in Colombia and Panama.

References

verticillata
Flora of Colombia
Flora of Panama
Vulnerable plants
Taxonomy articles created by Polbot